The Paget process was an early colour photography process patented in Britain in 1912 by G.S. Whitfield and first marketed by the Paget Prize Plate Company in 1913.  A paper-based Paget process was also briefly sold. Both were discontinued in the early 1920s. One of the most outstanding exponents of the Paget process was Australian photographer Frank Hurley.

Photography
The system used two glass plates, one of which was the colour screen plate while the other was a standard black-and-white negative plate. The colour screen plate comprised a series of red, green and blue filters, laid down in a regular pattern of lines to form a réseau, or matrix. Because the negatives of the time required long exposure times, the colours in the screen plate were diluted to let more light through to the negative, resulting in a quicker exposure. A viewing screen with more intense colour filters was used in combination with the developed positive to project a composite colour image.

The colour screen plate was usually sold as a separate item to the panchromatic negatives. A single colour screen plate could be placed into the camera and used to expose many negatives in succession. The resultant negatives looked like standard black-and-white negatives, with a noticeable crosshatch patterning in areas of strong colour.

Viewing
Transparency positives could be made from the system's panchromatic negatives by contact printing; these positives were then bound in register with a colour viewing screen of the same type as used for exposure, to reproduce the image in colour. Multiple copies could be printed from each negative, the resultant positives each being registered with their own colour viewing screens. If, on the other hand, a black-and-white print was required, the negative was used and the colour viewing screen ignored.

Many surviving Paget viewing screens have faded or suffered colour shifts over the years, the purplish hues which some of these present no longer giving a true indication of their original colour fidelity.

Advantages and disadvantages

One advantage of the Paget system was that Paget plates were more sensitive than contemporary autochrome plates, allowing exposures of around 1/25 second (four times faster than autochrome). It was also a negative/positive process with a separate colour screen, which meant that multiple prints were straightforward to produce.

The chief disadvantage of the system was that the colours were considered unfaithful and pale compared to the rich colours captured by autochrome.

External links
 Elusive colour: Paget Viewing Screens
 NATURAL COLOUR PHOTOGRAPHY IN AUSTRALIA 1895 – 1960
 British Imperial Trans-Antarctic Expedition, 1914-1917 - Paget plates by Frank Hurley

Photographic processes